Penicillium brocae is a fungal species of the genus Penicillium, which was isolated  in Chiapas in Mexico.  It is a symbiont of the mangrove tree Avicennia marina. 

P. brocae produces brocazine A, brocazine B, brocazine C,  brocazine D, brocazine F, bisthiodiketopiperazine, penicibrocazine C and the polyketides brocaenol A, brocaenol B, and brocaenol C.

See also
List of Penicillium species

References 

brocae
Fungi described in 2003